A viceroy's commissioned officer (VCO) was a senior Indian member of the British Indian Army. VCOs were senior in rank to warrant officers in the British Army, and held a commission issued by the viceroy. Also known as "Indian officers" or "native officers", they had authority only over Indian troops and were subordinate to all British King's (resp. Queen's) commissioned officers (KCO resp. QCO), Indian Commissioned Officers (ICO) and King's commissioned Indian officers (KCIO).

Similar ranks, as listed below, are retained in the Indian Army and Pakistan Army. There, they are known as junior commissioned officers.

History 
Under the British, there was a clear colonial context, with the VCOs being the highest ranks that an Indian could attain. The full commissioned officers were British, from the 18th century up to the beginning of the 20th century. However, that changed slowly under the principles of Indianisation. In 1905, a special (or one could say better a 'crippled' form) of King’s Commission in His Majesty’s Native Land Forces was instituted. Indians who had qualified through the Imperial Cadet Corps would earn a commission that was limited to have authority over Indian troops only and its holders could not rise above the rank of Major. From 1917, in the midst of World War I, Indians 'with good family background' became eligible to study at the Royal Military College, Sandhurst and the earn a commission as King's Commissioned Indian Officer (KCIO). By the time of independence in 1947, there were many Indian (and Pakistani) officers who had graduated from Sandhurst or the Indian Military Academy.

Ranks and appointments
In 1914, ranks held by VCOs were:

Cavalry
Rissaldar-Major (native 'Major', adviser to the British officers and commander)
Rissaldar (native 'Captain', troop commander)
Ressaidar (native 'Lieutenant', junior troop commander)
Jemadar (native 'Second Lieutenant', platoon commander)
Infantry, Indian Garrison Artillery, Indian Mountain Artillery and other arms
Subadar-Major (native 'Major', adviser to the British officers and commander)
Subadar (native 'Lieutenant', company commander)
Jemadar (native 'Second Lieutenant', platoon commander)

As a company commander a Subadar was roughly equivalent to a native Infantry 'Captain'. Nonetheless, in World War I, he was classified as native 'Lieutenant' but remained in the position of company commander. In result, there was no equivalent rank for a native 'Captain' in the Indian native Infantry etc. at that time.

There was only one Rissaldar-Major or Subadar-Major per regiment. The latter was established between 1817 and 1819 in the Bengal Army resp. the Madras Army. In 1825, the equivalent rank of Risaldar-Major was adopted by all Presidency armies. Both ranks would serve as a representative of their people to British officers, but could also command independent companies resp. troops of irregular regiments. While providing guidance to inexperienced British subalterns, they also discussed major issues concerning the Indian soldiers of all ranks with the Colonel (Infantry) or Commandant (Cavalry). Rissaldar-Majors or Subadar-Majors could be appointed Native A.-D.-C. to the Viceroy or the Governor of their British India Province. 

Beginning from 1903, there were also six (four from 1904) King's Indian Orderly Officers (KIOO), chosen each year to serve as the King's honourary bodyguard in the United Kingdom. They were appointed regardless of their specific ranks.

In the Indian cavalry existed the appointment of Woordie-Major. He was the assistant to the British adjudant.  Usually, a capable Ressaidar, Jemadar or Naib Risaldar (brevet Risaldar, in the Bombay cavalry only) was promoted to this position, then ranking above his substantive rank. The Naib Risaldar (also spelled Naib Ressaldar) ranked below Ressaidar and above Jemadar, but was roughly equivalent with the latter. The rank was abolished in 1865.

The VCO's status could be bolstered by honorary promotions, e.g. a Rissaldar-Major could held the honorary rank of Captain simultaneously, or a Jemadar was awarded by the honorary rank of Second Lieutenant. A custom often practised on retirement, but not exclusively. An honorary rank was not only a distinction but had the financial benefit of doubling the pension to be received by the retiring Indian officer.

Status and responsibilities 
The term 'Viceroy's Commissioned Officer' was formally adopted in 1885 as a substitute for the previously used 'Native Officer' (NO). In the same year, the term Native was dropped from regimental titles. These ranks were created to facilitate effective liaison between the British officers and their Indian troops. The soldiers who were promoted to VCO rank had long service and good service records, spoke reasonably fluent English, and could act as a common liaison point between officers and men and as advisers to the British officers on Indian affairs.

VCOs were treated and addressed with respect. Even a British officer would address a VCO as, for instance, 'subedar sahib' or 'sahib'. Nevertheless, they were only saluted by Indian rank and file, not by European other ranks and officers. Furthermore, VCOs did not mess with British officers but ran their own.

The three former presidency armies of Bengal, Bombay, and Madras were transformed into the newly established Army of India, in 1895. Each infantry regiment consisted now of one battailon of eight companies, with six British officers in the headquarters und two further British officers as wing officers resp. wing commanders. A 'wing' was a half-bataillon of four companies. A company was led by one Subadar, assisted by one Jemadar. The company itself counted ten native NCOs, 75 sepoys and two drummers. In the 1890s, the two wings were replaced by four 'double companies', commanded by one British Major or Captain, while the Indian chain of command maintained unaffected. By 1914 the proportion of VCOs to KCOs in an Indian infantry battalion was 16 to 14.

In irregular regiments such as those of the Silladar Cavalry, VCOs enjoyed a greater leeway and consequently a higher status due to the smaller number of British officers present. Usually, only the Commandant, the Second-in-Command, the Adjutant and the Surgeon were British, so a troop (equivalent to an infantry company) was commanded by a native resp. Indian Officer, who could even rise to squadron commander. From 1885, a Silladar regiment consisted of four (previously three) squadrons, with a British commander and a British S-in-C each. Each squadron had two 'half-squadrons' or troops of nine Indian NCOs, 70 sowars and one trumpeter, each led by a Rissaldar and a Jemadar as S-i-C.

Pay 
For example, in the last third of the 19th century, in the Bengal Army as the largest presidency army, the ranks of Subadar, Ressaldar, Ressaidar and Jemadar were divided in three (sometimes two) paygrades each (native sappers and miners, cavalry, infantry, but not native artillery). 

Around 1867/68, in native miners and sappers as well as in native infantry, the pay scale ranged from 30 Rs. for a Jemadar, 2nd Class to 100 Rs. for a Subadar, 1st class.  A Jemadar, 1st class had to be content with 35 Rs. whereas a Subadar, 3rd class was paid 67 Rs. and a Subadar, 2nd class drew 80 Rs. In the artillery, NOs were not split in different paygrades but were attached to them, so a Subadar in the light artillery was paid like a Subadar, 1st class (100 Rs.), in Garrison and Mountain artillery the sum was related to the pay of a Subadar, 2nd class (80 Rs.). A Jemadar drew 35 Rs. in all sorts of artillery, like a Jemadar, 1st class. The appointment of Subadar-Major (infantry only) earned an additional allowance of 25 Rs. 

Pay in native cavalry was much higher. In a regiment of six troops, a Jemadar, 3rd class drew 60 Rs. (i.e. 6 Pounds) per Mensem while a Jemadar, 1st class drew 80 Rs. The hihghest native officer's paygrade, Ressaldar, 1st class, drew 300 Rs. A Woordie-Major earned 150 Rs., exactly the same as a Ressaidar, 1st class.

In comparison, a Lieutenant in one of the seven European cavalry regiments of the Bengal Army in 1867/68, drew about 305 Rs. p.M., a Cornet's pay was about 250 Rs. A Cavalry Regimental Sergeant Major drew a bit less than 52 Rs. His colleague in the European infantry attached to the Bengal Army came near to 49 Rs., while a Colour sergeants drew almost 32 Rs.

Rank Insignia 
From the end of the 19th century, Jemadars wore one metal star on their shoulder-straps or shoulder-chains. Subadars and Rissaldars had two metal stars. In the Bombay Cavalry, Rissaldar and Ressaidar shared the same rank insignia, e.g. two silver metal stars. In the Indian Infantry, the Subadar-Major's insignia was one silver metal crown (Goorkha Regiments: bronze metal crown). In contrast, Rissaldar-Majors in Indian Cavalry had three silver metal stars only, before the insignia changed to a metal crown.

Until the late 19th century, the placement of Subadar-Major in the VCO-hierarchy of the Madras Army could vary. While in Bengal and in Bombay Cavalry the ranks Rissaldar and Rissaldar-Major were established, they were not in Madras Cavalry. There, the VCO-hierarchy was Jemadar - Subadar - Subadar-Major at least until 1885. The rank insignia of a Subadar-Major in Madras Cavalry was three gold metal stars, while his colleague in the Madras Infantry wore one embroidered silver crown.

Variety of rank spellings 
The spellings of the VCO ranks could vary significantly, mostly from presidency army to presidency army. Besides, there was also variation within the same army, between its different arms and bodies. For example, one finds for Rissaldar also Risaldar, Ressaldar and even Russuldar (in Bombay Cavalry only), at the same time. The spelling Ressalder was also known. Jemedar would alternativley spelled Jamadar, and Wurdie-Major could stand for Woordie-Major

See also 
Effendi, Governor's Commissioned Officer in the  King's African Rifles (KAR)

References

Military ranks of British India